The R40 Regional Highway is a highway that begins at Adenta in the Greater Accra Region and runs through Dodowa and Somanya to Kpong in the Eastern Region. It is also known as the Accra - Dodowa Road.

Route
The highway spans two regions, Greater Accra and Eastern. It is described as the Adenta Trom Road.

Greater Accra Region
The R40 begins in Adenta where it branches off the N4 as the Accra-Dodowa Road. This is the Adenta-Trom section. It heads through Frafraha, through Ashiyie to Amrahia where a toll booth is located. It then continues through Oyibi and Bawaleshi to Dodowa where the R13 (Afienya-Dodowa Road section) branches off the R40 to the east.

Both regions
After Dodowa, it courses through the Eastern Region to Ayikuma, just over the border then back into Greater Accra. It then goes to Amanfro before leaving the region once more.

Eastern Region
The road continues through Agomeda, Ogome, Somanya and Odumase Krobo to Kpong where it ends by meeting the N2.

See also
Ghana Road Network

References

Roads in Ghana